The Music City Center is a convention complex located in downtown Nashville, Tennessee, United States. It opened in May 2013.

The complex was designed by tvsdesign with Associated Architects: Tuck-Hinton Architects, Moody Nolan.

It was developed by Nashville Metropolitan Development and Housing Agency.

References

External links 

2013 establishments in Tennessee
Commercial buildings completed in 2013
Buildings and structures in Nashville, Tennessee
Convention centers in Tennessee
Event venues established in 2013